Tobias Viklund (born 8 May 1986) is a Swedish professional ice hockey defenceman, who is currently under contract with Modo Hockey of the HockeyAllsvenskan (Allsv).

Playing career
Viklund joined Russian club, Avtomobilist Yekaterinburg of the Kontinental Hockey League, on a two-year contract on 1 May 2013. He had previously spent the entirety of his 9 year professional career in the Swedish Hockey League.

Viklund played five seasons in the KHL with four different clubs before opting to leave as a free agent, agreeing to a one-year contract with German club,  Kölner Haie of the Deutsche Eishockey Liga on 10 June 2018.

In the 2018–19 season, Viklund appeared in just 14 games with Kölner Haie, posting 5 assists, before opting to return for a second stint with Kunlun Red Star of the KHL on 7 November 2018.

International play
Viklund has played several times for the Swedish national team, most recently in Channel One Cup in December 2008.

Career statistics

Regular season and playoffs

International

References

External links

1986 births
Living people
AIK IF players
Avtomobilist Yekaterinburg players
Frölunda HC players
Kölner Haie players
HC Kunlun Red Star players
HC Lada Togliatti players
Modo Hockey players
People from Kramfors Municipality
Skellefteå AIK players
HC Spartak Moscow players
Swedish ice hockey defencemen
HC Yugra players
Sportspeople from Västernorrland County